Connecticut's 23rd State Senate district elects one member of the Connecticut State Senate. It encompasses parts of Bridgeport and Stratford. It has been represented by Democrat Dennis Bradley since 2019.

Recent elections

2020

2018

2016

2014

2012

References

23